is a passenger railway station located in the city of Fuchū, Tokyo, Japan, operated by East Japan Railway Company (JR East).

Lines

Station layout
The station consists of a single island platform serving two tracks. The station entrance is on the east side of the tracks, and the station is linked to the Toshiba Fuchu Plant entrance on the west side by an overbridge that is only for Toshiba employees. The station is staffed.

Platforms

History

The line became part of the Musashino Line from 1 April 1973. With the privatization of JNR on 1 April 1987, the station came under the control of JR East.

Passenger statistics
In fiscal 2019, the station was used by an average of 15,064 passengers daily (boarding passengers only). The passenger figures (boarding passengers only) for previous years are as shown below.

Surrounding area
 Toshiba Fuchu factory
 Fuchu Prison
 United Nations Asia and Far East Institute for the Prevention of Crime and the Treatment of Offenders
 The Ministry of Justice Training Institute for Correction Officials

Parks

 Kita-Fuchu Park
 Fuchu-Chuo park
 Fuchu Park
 Suzukake Park

Schools and colleges
 Tokyo University of Agriculture and Technology
 Fuchu High School
 Nogyo High School
 Fuchu No. 1 Junior High School
 Fuchu No. 4 Junior High School
 Fuchu No. 1 Elementary School
 Fuchu No. 9 Elementary School

Bus services

Kita-Fuchū Station is served by Keio Bus services, which stop next to the station.

See also
 List of railway stations in Japan

References

External links

 Kita-Fuchū Station information (JR East) 

Stations of East Japan Railway Company
Railway stations in Tokyo
Railway stations in Japan opened in 1956
Musashino Line
Fuchū, Tokyo